The 1987 LEN Women's Champions' Cup was the inaugural edition of the premier competition for European women's water polo national champion clubs, organized by LEN and held in France.

The final four was played in December 1987 between Dauphins Créteil, Donk Gouda, Szentes and Volturno with Dutch club Donk Gauda becoming the first European champions by beating host Dauphins Créteil in the final.

Final four
Créteil, France

References

Champions Cup
LEN Euro League Women seasons
1987 in European sport